

Oman
 Mombasa – Nasr ibn Abdallah al-Mazru‘i, Wali of Mombasa (1698–1728)

Portugal
 Angola – António de Saldanha de Albuquerque, Governor of Angola (1709–1713)
 Macau –
 Francisco de Melo e Castro, Governor of Macau (1710–1711)
 Antonio de Sequeira de Noronha, Governor of Macau (1711–1714)

Great Britain
 Massachusetts – Joseph Dudley, Governor of Massachusetts Bay Colony (1702–1715)

Colonial governors
Colonial governors
1711